Sir John Arundell VII (1421–1473) of Lanherne in the parish of St Mawgan in Pydar, Cornwall, was Sheriff of Cornwall and Admiral of Cornwall, and served as a general for King Henry VI in his French wars. He became the largest free tenant in Cornwall.

Origins
He was born in Bideford in Devon in about 1421, the son and heir of Sir John Arundell (1392–1423) of Lanherne by his wife Margaret Burghersh, widow of Sir John Grenville, lord of the manor of Bideford, and a daughter of Sir John Burghersh. The Arundell family was long established at  Lanherne.

Career
He was knighted by King Edward IV in 1463 and fought at the Battle of Tewkesbury in 1471.

Marriage and issue
He married twice:
Firstly to Elizabeth de Morley, a daughter of Thomas de Morley, 5th Baron Morley, by whom he had one child:
Anne Arundell, who married Sir James Tyrrell, best known for allegedly confessing to the murders of the Princes in the Tower under the orders of King Richard III of England.
Secondly, on 5 March 1451, he married Katherine Chideocke, the widow of William Stafford, by whom he had eight children:
Sir Thomas Arundell (1454–1485), son and heir;
Catherine Arundell 
Elizabeth Arundell, who married Giles Daubeney, 1st Baron Daubeney;
Thomasine Arundell, who married Henry Marney, 1st Baron Marney, KG, of Leyre-Marney;
Margaret Arundell, who married Sir William Capel (c.1446-1515), Lord Mayor of London.
Ellen Arundell 
Dorothy Arundell 
Jane Arundell

Death
John Arundell died in November 1473 at his seat of Lanherne in Cornwall.

Ancestry

See also

 Arundell family

References

1420s births
1473 deaths
English knights
Military personnel from Bideford
People from St Mawgan
High Sheriffs of Cornwall
John (1421)
15th-century English landowners
Knights Bachelor